The Cameroonian Women's Cup is a women's association football competition in Cameroon. pitting regional teams against each other.  It was founded in 1986. It is the women's equivalent of the Cameroonian Cup for men. The winner of the 2019 edition is Louves Minproff for the sixth time.

Finals 
The list of winners and runners-up:

Most successful clubs

See also 
 Cameroonian Women's Championship

References

External links 

 
Cam
Women's football competitions in Cameroon